William César de Oliveira (born 17 October 1968) is a former Brazilian international footballer. He has played for several domestic club teams in Brazil such as Vasco Esporte Clube, Flamengo, Fluminense FC, Clube Atlético Mineiro etc.

William was part of the Brazilian U17 football team at the inaugural edition of the FIFA U-16 World Championship (now known as FIFA U17 World Cup) in 1985. He played a vital role in Brazil's third-place finish at the first edition of the Youth FIFA World Cup with scoring 5 goals in the entire tournament. He was awarded the Golden Ball at the 1985 World Cup as he was the second leading goal scorer in the tournament just behind Marcel Witeczek of Germany.

References

External links 
 Profile at Supervasco
 Profile at Footballia

1968 births
Living people
Brazil international footballers
Brazilian footballers
Association football midfielders
CR Vasco da Gama players
Clube Atlético Mineiro players
Fluminense FC players
Guarani FC players
América de Cali footballers
Club Alianza Lima footballers
Americano Futebol Clube players
Brazil youth international footballers
Brazilian expatriate footballers
Expatriate footballers in Colombia
Expatriate footballers in Peru
People from Cuiabá
Sportspeople from Mato Grosso